Charles John Wells (9 October 1911 – 5 July 1984) was an Australian politician who represented the South Australian House of Assembly seat of Florey for the Labor Party from 1970 to 1979.

References

1911 births
1984 deaths
Members of the South Australian House of Assembly
Australian Labor Party members of the Parliament of South Australia
20th-century Australian politicians